Ystoria Mongalorum is a report, compiled by Giovanni da Pian del Carpine, of his trip to the Mongol Empire. Written in the 1240s, it is the oldest European account of the Mongols. Giovanni was the first European to try to chronicle Mongol history.

Background 
Giovanni recorded the information he collected in a work, variously entitled in the manuscripts, Ystoria Mongalorum quos nos Tartaros appellamus ("History of the Mongols, which we call Tartars"), and Liber Tartarorum, or Liber Tatarorum ("Book of the Tartars [or Tatars]"). This treatise has nine chapters. The first eight describe the Tartar's country, climate, manners, religion, character, history, policy, and tactics, and on the best way to oppose them. The ninth chapter describes regions he passed through.

The title is significant, as it emphasizes that the Mongols were not identical to the Tatars. In fact, the author points out that Mongols were quite offended by such a label: they vanquished Tatars in several campaigns around 1206, after which the Tartars ceased to exist as an independent ethnic group.

The report gives a narrative of his journey, what he had learned about Mongol history, as well as Mongol customs of the time.

Giovanni, as the first European at the time to have visited Mongolia and returned to talk about it, became somewhat of a celebrity upon returning to Europe. He gave what would be called today a lecture tour across the continent.

The book must have been prepared immediately after the return of the traveller, for the Friar Salimbene di Adam, who met him in France in the year of his return (1247), gave some interesting particulars. For a long time the work was but partially known, and that chiefly through an abridgment in the compilation of Vincent of Beauvais (Speculum Historiale) made in the generation following the traveller's own, and printed first in 1473. Richard Hakluyt (1598) and Bergeron (1634) published portions of the original work; but the complete and genuine text was not printed till 1838, when it was published by Armand d'Avezac, in the 4th volume of the Recueil de voyages et de mémoires of the Geographical Society of Paris. Carpine's companion Benedict also left a brief narrative taken down from his oral relation.

Two redactions of the Ystoria Mongalorum are known to exist: Giovanni's own and another. An abridgement of the First Redaction can be found in the Turin National Library. The Tartar Relation is an expanded version of the second redaction.

The standard scholarly edition of Ystoria is by Anastasius Wyngaert, in Sinica Franciscana, vol. 1 (Quaracchi, 1929), pp. 3–130..

Content 
Like some other famous medieval itineraries, it shows an absence of a traveler's or author's egotism, and contains, even in the last chapter, scarcely any personal narrative. Giovanni was not only an old man when he went on this mission, but was, according to accidental evidence in the annals of his order, a fat and heavy man (vir gravis et corpulentus), insomuch that, contrary to Franciscan precedent, he rode a donkey between his preachings in Germany. In his narrative, however, he never complains.

His book, as to personal and geographical detail, is inferior to one a few years later by a younger brother of the same order, William of Rubruck or Rubruquis—who was Louis IX's most noteworthy envoy to the Mongols. In spite of these defects—and the credulity he shows in the Oriental tales, which is sometimes childishly absurd—Friar Giovanni's Ystoria is, in many ways, the chief literary memorial of European overland expansion before Marco Polo. Among his innovative recommendations was development of light cavalry to combat Mongol tactics.

It first revealed the Mongol world to Catholic Christendom. The account of Tatar manners, customs and history is perhaps the best treatment of the subject by any Christian writer of the Middle Ages. He provided four lists: of nations conquered by the Mongols, nations that had (as of 1245–1247) successfully resisted, the Mongol princes, and witnesses to his narrative, including various Kiev merchants. All these catalogues, unrivaled in Western medieval literature, are of great historical value.

Chapters 

 Prologue

The Prologue identifies the main audience of John of Plano Carpini's account as "all the faithful of Christ." The Prologue explains that John of Plano Carpini has been sent to the land of the Tartars by the Pope so "if by chance they [the Tartars] made a sudden attack they would not find the Christian people unprepared." John traveled "during a year and four months and more" with Friar Benedict the Pole "who was our [John's crew] companion in our tribulations and our interpreter."

 Chapter I The Land of the Tartars, its Position, Physical Features and Climate

 Chapter II Of their Persons, their Clothes, their Dwelling-Places, Possessions and Marriage

 Chapter III Of their Worship of God, those things which they Consider to be Sins, Divinations and Purifications, Funeral Rites, etc.

 Chapter IV Of their Character, Good and Bad, their Customs, Food, etc.

 Chapter V The Beginning of the Empire of the Tartars and their Chief Men, and the Dominion Exercised by the Emperor and the Princes

 Chapter VI Of War, their Battle Array, Arms, their Cunning in Engagements, Cruelty to Captives, Assault on Fortifications, their Bad Faith with those who Surrender to them, etc.

 Chapter VII How they Make Peace, the Names of the Countries they have Conquered, the Tyranny they Exercise over the Inhabitants, and the Countries which have Manfully Resisted them

 Chapter VIII How to Wage War against the Tartars; the Intentions of the Tartars; Arms and Army Organisations, how to Meet their Cunning in Battle, the Fortification of Camps and Cities, and what should be Done with Tartar Prisoners

 Chapter IX The Countries through which we Passed, their Position, the Witnesses we Came across, and the Court of the Emperor of the Tartars and his Princes

 Appendix

References

External links 
 Ystoria Mongalorum in Latin and English

13th-century documents
History of Mongolia
13th century in Asia